KIAA1967, also known as Deleted in Breast Cancer 1, is a protein which in humans is encoded by the KIAA1967 gene.

Function 
Recent studies show that DBC1 is an inhibitor of the sirtuin-type deacetylase, SIRT1, which deacetylates histones and p53. DBC1 is likely to regulate the activity of SIRT1 or related deacetylases by sensing the soluble products or substrates of the NAD-dependent deacetylation reaction.

References

Further reading